Vidarbha Janata Congress (Vidarbha Peoples Congress) is a political party in the Indian state of Maharashtra. VJC was launched on 9 September 2002 by a former Member of Parliament Jambuwantrao Dhote. The party was formed to demand statehood for the Vidarbha region separate from Maharashtra.

The party's constitution, was released at Sewagram on 2 October, had a special provision which allowed politicians of all hues to join up without quitting their original parties. After its launch, the VJC held a public rally at Chitnavis Park on 23 January, and took a vow to fight for Vidarbha. A rathyatra was taken out in the region to "awaken" people, followed by a Nagpur-Delhi march.

See also
Indian National Congress breakaway parties

Indian National Congress breakaway groups
Political parties in Maharashtra
Organisations based in Nagpur
Political parties established in 2002
2002 establishments in Maharashtra